For the Brazilian footballer, see Mário Lúcio da Silva Junior

Mário Lúcio or Izé (born October 21, 1964) is a Capeverdean singer, composer, writer, politician and a painter.  From 2011 to 2016, he was the Capeverdean Minister of Culture.

Biography

Childhood and teenage years
He was born Lúcio Matias de Sousa Mendes in the town of Tarrafal in the island of Santiago's north in the final decade of Portuguese rule, he is a descendant of Jorge and Garda Brito.

Mário Lúcio lost his father when he was 12.  At age 15, he and his seven siblings lost his mother.  He lived in the barrack buildings of the Cape Verdean forces in his hometown under the care of the military. In 1984, he received a scholarship by the Cuban government in Havana where he studied and graduated six years later. He returned to his country where he practiced law. Between 1996 and 2001, he was member of the Cape Verdean parliament.

Musical career
He later founded the band Simentera.  His ideas received an invitation by his government and became author of the Cape Verdean Musical Projects for Expo 92 in Seville and Expo 98 in Lisbon.  He is a founder and director of Quintal da Música Cultural Association, a private cultural center featuring traditional music. As a composer, he was a member of SACEM (Societé française des Droits d'auteur) with compositions that Cesária Évora and other Cape Verdean artists recorded. He is the permanent composer of the Raiz di Polon Company, the only contemporary dance formation in the islands.  In 1996, he recorded an album Nôs Morna, Ildo Lobo's first solo album.  He composed at a request of the Porto European Culture Capital on the soundtrack of the play Adão e as Sete Pretas de Fuligem, performed by João Branco.  He later attended at Fesquintal de Jazz, the Cape Verde International Jazz Festival whom he founded, several concerts in Brazil and Cuba as well as some European Countries and the African mainland, his notable appearance was the 2011 FMM Festival das Musicaus do Mundo in Sines, Portugal on June 24.

Bibliographical works and paintings
He is also a painter and participate in some of his exhibitions.  He also appeared in poetry, and theater.  In 2009, he wrote a novel titled Testamento (Testament) published by Dom Quixote, his recent novel won the Carlos de Olvieira Award and was a bestseller in Portugal. His next novel released in 2014 was Biografia do Língua which about the history of a language, the novel won the Miguel Torga Literary Award in July 2015.

Minister of Culture
In late 2011 after the elections, he became Capeverdean Minister of Culture for five years, he succeeded Manuel Veiga as minister.  In his first year on November 2 and 3, he went to Paris to visit with the French Ministries of Foreign Affairs and Culture.  After the 2016 general election, Álvaro Anibal Barbosa Vicente succeeded Mário Lúcio Sousa as culture minister.

Works
 Nascimento de Um Mundo ["Born in a World"] (poetry, 1990)
 Sob os Signos da Luz [About the Signs of Light] (poetry, 1992)
 Para Nunca Mais Falarmos de Amor (poetry, 1999)
 Os Trinta Dias do Homem mais Pobre do Mundo ["30 Days of More Poverty in the World on Man"] (fiction, 2000 - Winner of the 1st Portuguese Language Bibliographical Fund Award)
 Adão e As Sete Pretas de Fuligem (theater, 2001).
Vidas Paralelas [Parallel Lives] (fiction, 2003)
 Saloon (theater, 2004);
 Teatro [Theater/Theatre] (collections, 2008);
 Novíssimo Testamento [A Brand New Testament] (novel, 2009).
 Biografia do Língua [Biography of a Language]

Discography

With Simentera
 Raiz (Lusafrica/Sunny Moon, 1992)
 "Codjeta", originally by Kaká Barbosa
 "Nha Codê”, originally by Pedro Cardoso
 Barro E Voz (Mélodie/Indigo, 1997)
 "Nha nobo"
 Cabo Verde En Serenata (Piranha/EFA, 2000)
"Tchapeu di padja" - originally a poem by Jorge Barbosa
"Valsa Azul"
 Tr'Adictional (Mélodie/Indigo, 2003)
 "Lua Cheia", featuring Maria João

Solo
Mar e Luz [Sea and Light] (2004)
Ao Vivo e outros [Live and Other] (2006)
Badyo (2008)
Kreol (2010)
Funanight (2016)

As writer
"Ilha de Santiago" ["Santiago Island"], for the album Lovely Difficult (2013) by Mayra Andrade

Awards
Received the Portuguese Language Library Fund Award in 2000
He was decorated by the President of the Republic of his country in 2006 with the Order of Vulcan alongside Cesária Évora, he was the youngest to be awarded.
He was awarded the Carlos de Oliveira Literary Award in 2009 on Novíssimo Testamento
He was awarded the Miguel Torga Literary Award in 2015 on the work Biografia do Língua

References

External links
Profile of Mário Lúcio, also in French and Portuguese
Video of his performance at the FMM Festival das Musicas do Mundo in Sines, Portugal in 2011

1964 births
Living people
20th-century Cape Verdean male singers
Cape Verdean painters
Cape Verdean male writers
Cape Verdean novelists
Culture ministers of Cape Verde
People from Tarrafal
University of Havana alumni
Morna (music) singers
Coladeira singers
21st-century Cape Verdean male singers